Kumi (くみ, クミ) is a given name.

Possible writings in Japanese

Kumi can be written using different kanji characters and can mean

組, "group, party, pair, band, class" 
 as a given name
 久美, "long time, beauty" (also read Hisami)
 久実, "long time, fruit"
 来未, "come, not yet"
 九美, "nine, beauty"
 九海, "nine seas"

The given name can also be written in hiragana or katakana.

People 

 with the given name Kumi

 Kumi (born 1976), vocalist of the Japanese band Love Psychedelico
, Japanese long-distance runner
, Japanese pop and neo soul singer
, Japanese pop singer and voice actress
, Japanese actress
 Kumi Mori (born 1985), Japanese handball goalkeeper
 Kumi Naidoo (born 1965), South African human rights activist and head of Greenpeace
, former professional volleyball player
, Japanese race walker
, Japanese voice actress
, Japanese idol
, Japanese recording artist
, Japanese-American actress
, Australian television broadcaster and presenter
, Japanese video game music composer
, Japanese football striker
, women's professional shogi player

Fictional characters 

 with the given name Kumi
 Kumi, a ladybug in the cartoon series Beat Bugs
 Kumi, a fox Gacha pet in the Korean online video game Grand Chase
 Kumi, a character in the popular children's doll franchise Bratz
 Kumi Mashiba, a character in the manga and anime series Fighting Spirit
 Kumi Ōkubo, a character in the Japanese fighting game series Asuka 120% Burning Festival
 Kumi Hayami, a character in the magical girl anime series Magical Fairy Persia
 Kumi Kawamura, a character in the manga series Alien Nine
 Kumi Hirose, a character in the role-playing game Revelations: Persona
 Kumi Sugimoto, a character in the manga and anime series Captain Tsubasa
 Kumi Mashiba, a character in the anime series (Makunouchi Ippo's love interest) Hajime no Ippo
 Kazeumi Kumi (Bukubukuchagama), a character in the light novel, anime And manga series (Overlord)
 Kumi Kibashi, a character in Gal*Gun!

See also

 Kumi (disambiguation)

Japanese feminine given names
Japanese unisex given names